Dlimi is a surname. Notable people with the surname include:

Ahmed Dlimi (1931–1983), Moroccan general
Daniel Dlimi, former guitarist for Swedish death metal band Aeon
Habib Dlimi (born 1950), Tunisian wrestler